The KU Leuven Association is a large Belgian association for higher education. The leading institute is the Katholieke Universiteit Leuven.

Introduction
The association has thirteen founding members which are main universities or colleges in Belgium with about 66,000 students in total. It's the largest educational association in Flanders and it started its operation on July 11, 2002.

The goal of the association is to "occupy a position of strength within the new European educational landscape and to work together towards quality improvements in education". It also holds a large amount of international students, and has a very strong international orientation and atmosphere.

Members
 KU Leuven
 LUCA School of Arts
 Odisee
 Thomas More
 UC Leuven-Limburg
 Katholieke Hogeschool Vives

References

External links
 Associatie K.U.Leuven 
 K.U.Leuven Association 

KU Leuven
2002 establishments in Belgium
College and university associations and consortia in Europe